Delias echidna is a butterfly in the family Pieridae. It was described by William Chapman Hewitson in 1861. It is found in the Indomalayan realm (Serang) and the Australasian realm (Ambon); that is it is found on both sides of the Wallace line.

The wingspan is about 64–70 mm.

Subspecies
D. e. echidna (Ceram)
D. e. ambonensis Talbot, 1928 (Ambon)

References

External links
Delias at Markku Savela's Lepidoptera and Some Other Life Forms

echidna
Butterflies described in 1861
Butterflies of Indonesia
Taxa named by William Chapman Hewitson